East Point is the name of several places:

In Australia
 East Point, Northern Territory
 East Point Military museum located in East Point, Northern Territory

In Canada
East Point, Prince Edward Island

In Hong Kong:
East Point, Hong Kong

In the Republic of Ireland:
 East Point, Dublin

In the United States of America:
East Point, Alabama
East Point, Georgia
East Point (MARTA station) located in East Point, Georgia 
East Point, Kentucky
East Point, Louisiana
 East Point, and East Point Military Reservation in Nahant, Massachusetts
East Point, Virginia
In the British Indian Ocean Territory (UK)
East Point, British Indian Ocean Territory

See also
Eastpoint, Florida
Eastpointe, Michigan